Sostra Heights (‘Sostrenski Vazvisheniya’ \'so-stren-ski v&-zvi-'she-ni-ya\) are the heights rising ro 2352 m at Mount Malone on the east side of northern Sentinel Range in Ellsworth Mountains, Antarctica.  They extend 22 km in northwest–southeast direction and 16.5 km in northeast–southwest direction.  The heights are bounded by Embree Glacier to the south, Sabazios Glacier to the west, Newcomer Glacier to the north and Rutford Ice Stream to the east, and separated by Robinson Pass to the southwest from the side ridge that trends 9.15 km east-northeastwards from Mount Dalrymple on the main crest of Sentinel Range. Their interior is drained by Anchialus Glacier and Vit Ice Piedmont.

The heights are named after the ancient Roman fortress of Sostra in Northern Bulgaria.

Location
US mapping in 1961.

Features
Geographical features include:

 Anchialus Glacier
 Blenika Peak
 Bracken Peak
 Embree Glacier
 Mount Lanning
 Mount Malone
 Mount McKeown
 Newcomer Glacier
 Robinson Pass
 Sabazios Glacier
 Skaklya Glacier
 Vit Ice Piedmont
 Zhenda Glacier

Maps
 Newcomer Glacier.  Scale 1:250 000 topographic map.  Reston, Virginia: US Geological Survey, 1961.
 Antarctic Digital Database (ADD). Scale 1:250000 topographic map of Antarctica. Scientific Committee on Antarctic Research (SCAR). Since 1993, regularly upgraded and updated.

Notes

References
 Sostra Heights. SCAR Composite Gazetteer of Antarctica.
 Bulgarian Antarctic Gazetteer. Antarctic Place-names Commission. (details in Bulgarian, basic data in English)

External links
 Sostra Heights. Copernix satellite image

Mountains of Ellsworth Land
Bulgaria and the Antarctic